The Jean Moulin University Lyon 3, also referred to as Lyon 3, is one of the three public universities of Lyon, France. It is named after the French Resistance fighter Jean Moulin and specialises in Law, Politics, Philosophy, Management and languages.

It is under the purview of the Academy of Lyon. A total of 27,000 students study there for undergraduate and postgraduate degrees. The university is a member of the University of Lyon, the Coimbra Group and the European University Association (EUA).

History

University Lyon 3 was established in the early 1970s (26 July 1973), part of the reorganisation of higher education following the events of May 68 that rocked the academic world.  It was named after Jean Moulin, a wartime resistance leader who was captured in Lyon. It is one of the largest institutions within the University of Lyon attracting over 27,000 students, including over 4,000 international students.  It specialises in the humanities and social sciences.

Campuses
The university is located on three different campuses: the first one, called "Les Quais", is by the Rhône (river), the second, called "Manufacture des Tabacs" in the south part of Lyon, and the last one in Bourg-en-Bresse, about 70km north of the city.

Faculties
The university is organised into four main faculties, a management school, and a University Institute of Technology. The campus at Bourg-en-Bresse offers the full range of courses.

Faculty of Law

The Lyon Law School, was created by decree issued on 29 October 1875, by Marshal Mac Mahon, was inaugurated by French President Felix Faure on 1 May 1896. The Faculty of Law of Lyon celebrates 130 years, largest centre for law students from the city of Lyon, it has all the legal training of the first year Degree tray until 8 (or more). The Lyon Law school enjoys a national and international reputation of distinction. In the latest edition of the Gourman Report (6th ed, 1993), it was ranked 1st among France's provincial universities, and 5th among European universities, behind Paris, Oxford, Cambridge and Heidelberg.

The Law School has always been in touch with foreign legal systems. Before the First World War, the Lyon Law School founded the Law school of Beirut, in Lebanon. These two cities, Lyon and Beirut, were both on one of Silk Roads, which started in China and ended in Lyon; intellectual, artistic and industrial interests converged. The Institute of Comparative Law was created by Édouard Lambert in 1920, and now bears his name. In 1949 he assisted the jurist Abd El-Razzak El-Sanhuri in writing the Egyptian Civil Code, which would form the foundation of Egyptian civil law. Cambodia was also the scene of the development of the Lyon Law School, before the Vietnam War. Quite frequently, the Dean of the Lyon Law School had previously been or was to become a Dean in Beirut or Phnom Penh.

The law school is known for research of history of law and family law. It is also famous in the field of Business Law, thanks to its master's degree in Business and Tax law , coupled with the most famous degree in the field of business Law in France: DJCE (DJCE stands for "Diplôme de Juriste Conseil en Entreprise" or Corporate Jurist Diploma in English). The Faculty of law also proposes the preparation of master 2 business and financial engineering ranked 7th, Master 2 audiovisual & media law ranked 4th among the best master's degrees by SMBG 2015. The Law faculty also includes the department of political science : international relations (international security, diplomacy, francophone studies) propose the preparation of master 2 international relations ranked 5th among the best master's degrees in international security and defense by SMBG ranking 2015. In 2008, it launched its own LL.M in International and European Law. The law school offers several joint programs in business law with EM Lyon business school, in criminal science with the faculty of medicine of university of Lyon, in security studies with France's National Police College.

The faculty organise conferences with INTERPOL, France's National Police College (ENSP) and Handicap International on a regular basis.

In 2021/22 there were almost 11,000 students registered in the Faculty of Law accounting for over 40% of students at the university.

Faculty of Philosophy
The Faculty of Philosophy offers specialist courses in Ethics, Health philosophy, History of philosophy, Culture & health, Aesthetics, Logic, Political and legal philosophy. The professorial staff of the Faculty of Philosophy of Lyon 3 included Régis Debray and includes Mauro Carbone, Jean-Jacques Wunenburger, Jean-Claude Beaune, Jean-Pierre Ginisti, François Guéry, Bruno Pinchard, Bimbenet Etienne, Jean-Joël Duhot. In 2021, it had over 850 students, including 60 doctoral students.

Faculty of Letters and Civilisations
The Faculty of Letters and Civilisations complements and collaborates with the University Lyon 2 and the ENS de Lyon. The faculty is organised into five departments: Ancient Languages and Literatures, Modern Literature, History, Geography-Planning, and Information-Communication.  In 2021/22, there was almost 100 faculty and over 2,700 students registered.

Faculty of Languages
The Faculty of Languages provides instruction in two broad areas: Applied Foreign Languages (LEA) and Languages, Letters and Foreign and Regional Civilisations (LLCER). The foreign languages taught include German, English, Arabic, Chinese, Russian, Polish, Portuguese, Greek, Hebrew, Italian, Japanese, Korean, Sanskrit and Hindi. There are almost 5,000 students in the Faculty. In 2021/22 there were almost 5,000 students registered in the Faculty of Languages.

iaelyon School of Management

The iaelyon School of Management is located in the historical complex of the "Manufacture des Tabacs" in the heart of Lyon. Founded in 1956, it has 8000 students in 2021 (including 2000 in postgraduate studies), accounting for more almost 30% of the total student population at Lyon 3 University. In addition to the 150 some professors at the IAE, 400 executives from private, external companies contribute to the education.

The various courses offered include four bachelor's degrees (Licence), eight professional bachelor's degrees (Licence professionnelles), nine master's degrees (with 40 specializations) and preparatory courses for the chartered accountants examination.

The IAE of Lyon is one of the top French institutions for research and training in management. The school is highly internationalized with partnerships with over 150 universities in more than 50 countries.

Institute of Technology
The IUT offers a range of short courses and professional programmes in technology.

Notable faculty

Prior to division of University of Lyon 
 Maurice Merleau-Ponty (1908-1961), philosopher.
 Gilles Deleuze (1925-1995), philosopher. Taught at the School of Philosophy from 1965 to 1969.

After division of University of Lyon 
 Gérard E. Weil (1926-1986), biblical scholar
 Jean Varenne (1926-1997), Indologist; far-right politician 
 Guy Achard (born 1936), Roman historian
 Jean-Francois Mayer (born 1957), religious historian,
 Jean Haudry (born 1934), professor of Sanskrit; far-right politician
 Régis Debray (born 1940), intellectual, journalist, government official, and professor.
 Pierre Vial (born 1942), medievalist; far-right politician
 Gilles Guyot (born 1946), professor of management. 
 Bernard Lugan (born 1946), professor of African history; far-right politician
 Serge Guinchard (born 1946), jurist, professor emeritus at Université Panthéon-Assas.
 Michel Mercier (born 1947), former minister of Justice (2010 until 2012)
 Shawn Wong (born 1949) - American professor of creative writing
 Bruno Gollnisch (born 1950), professor of Japanese language and civilisation; far-right politician
 Denis Crouzet (born 1953), historian
 Mauro Carbone (born 1956), philosopher
 László Trócsányi (born 1956), Hungarian lawyer and politician
 Geneviève Gobillot, scholar of Islam
 Tristan Garcia (born 1981), philosopher and novelist
 Pierre-Jean Souriac, historian

Notable alumni

Prior to division of University of Lyon 
 Ume Kenjirō (1860-1910), drafter of the Japanese civil code, and a founder of Hosei University
 Motono Ichirō (1862-1918), statesman and diplomat, former foreign minister of Japan
 Louis Josserand (1868-1941), legal scholar, council at Court of Cassation
 François Perroux (1903-1987), economist, professor at the Collège de France
 Frantz Fanon (1925-1961), psychiatrist, philosopher, revolutionary and writer whose work is influential in the field of post-colonial studies. 
 Anne-Marie Escoffier (born 1942), socialist politician
 Antoine Ghanem (1943-2007), Lebanese politician and an MP in the Lebanese Parliament.
 Georges Chapouthier (born 1945), neuroscientist and philosopher.
 Dominique Perben (born 1945), former minister of Justice (2002–2005), and minister of transportation (2005–2007).
 Serge Guinchard (born 1946), jurist, professor emeritus at Université Panthéon-Assas.

After division of University of Lyon 
 Michel Mercier (born 1947), former minister of Justice (2010 until 2012)
 Jacqueline Oble (born 1950), Ivorian lawyer and politician
 Georges Fenech (born 1954), judge and politician (UMP)
 Étienne Blanc (born 1954), politician (LR)
 Patrick Louis (born 1955), politician and member of the European Parliament 
 Farès Boueiz (born 1955), Lebanese lawyer and politician
 Reine Alapini-Gansou (born 1956), judge on the International Court of Justice.
 Walid Phares (born 1957), Donald Trump's foreign policy adviser, Lebanese-American scholar and analyst for MSNBC, professor at National War College (NWC)
 Jean-Francois Mayer (born 1957, historian of religion
 Anne Hidalgo (born 1959), Mayor of Paris, member of the Socialist Party
 Dominique Dord (born 1959), politician, member of the National Assembly of France.
 Frigide Barjot (born 1962), humorist, and political activist
 Frank Bournois (born 1962), business academic
 Andrew Hussey (born 1963), historian of French culture
 Yves Nicolin (born 1963), politician (UMP)
 Seyed Mohammad Hosseini (born 1963), Iraqi diplomat.
 Yacouba Isaac Zida (born 1965), former Prime Minister of Burkina Faso.
 Michel Havard (born 1967), politician (UMP)
 Kadra Ahmed Hassan (born 1973), permanent representative of Djibouti to the United Nations at Geneva
 Sylvie Tellier (born 1978), Miss France 2002, lawyer, national director of both Miss France and Miss Europe Organization
 Audrey Dufeu-Schubert (born 1980), politician (La République En Marche!)
 Coralie Dubost (born 1983), lawyer, politician (La République En Marche!)
 Gwei Lun-mei (born 1983), Taiwanese actress.
 Julien Rochedy (born 1988), French politician
 Meg Otanwa, Nigerian actress

Students
The biggest school in terms of number of students is the Faculty of Law (10,460), the Business School (IAE) with (8,578). Then comes, the Faculty of Languages (4851) and the Faculty of Arts (13%). Other students attend the Faculty of Philosophy, or programmes such as professional short-term degree.
[2005 figures]

See also
 List of public universities in France by academy

References

Universities and colleges in Lyon
3rd arrondissement of Lyon
Educational institutions established in 1973
1973 establishments in France
Lyon 3